Suzanne Pepper (1939 – 29 June 2022) was a Hong Kong-based American author, political scientist, and former editor from 1995 to 1996 of the Chinese University of Hong Kong's China Review.

Biography
Pepper left the United States for Hong Kong in the 1960s to take up Chinese language studies. There she met fellow languages student VG Kulkarni, an Indian army officer posted to India's consulate in Hong Kong.  After several years in New York where they married in 1970, they returned to Hong Kong in 1973.

Pepper gained a PhD in political science from University of California at Berkeley in 1972. She authored a number of political science works focusing on China in general, and Hong Kong in particular. She was also a founding contributor to Hong Kong Free Press.

Pepper kept a blog, Hong Kong Focus, which is now maintained by Hong Kong Free Press.

Pepper was an honorary fellow of the Chinese University of Hong Kong, and an honorary lifetime member of the Foreign Correspondents Club of Hong Kong.

Pepper died on 29 June 2022 in Hong Kong, following a short illness.

Bibliography

References

External links
 Hong Kong Focus – Pepper's blog, now maintained by Hong Kong Free Press

1939 births
2022 deaths
Hong Kong journalists

American women journalists
American women political scientists
American political scientists
21st-century American women
Chinese University of Hong Kong people